Nabû-šuma-iškun, inscribed mdNabû-šuma-iškunun, and meaning "Nabu has set a name", was king of Babylon, speculatively ca. 761 – 748 BC (see below for provenance), and ruled during a time of great civil unrest. He came from the Bīt-Dakkūri tribe, a Chaldean group apparently unrelated to that of his immediate predecessor, Erība-Marduk.

Biography

His place in the sequence of Babylonian rulers is confirmed by an Assyrian Synchronistic Kinglist fragment. A contemporary source for information concerning his reign is found in an inscription of the governor of Borsippa, Nabû-šuma-imbi, which highlights his weakness and the autonomy of his regional officials. This barrel cylinder records the struggle over the control of their fields in the face of the incursions of marauders from Babylon and Dilbat; also Chaldeans and Arameans. At night, the city streets and its temple area were transformed into a battleground. During the fifth and sixth years of the king, the strife was so great that the cultic idol of Nabû was prevented from participating in the Akītu, or new year festival in Babylon. The coincidental recording of years five and six of a no longer legible ruler in the Chronicle of the Market Prices has led this reference to be assigned to him. In the king’s eighth year, Nabû-šuma-imbi was able to install a certain Nabû-mutakkil as a temple official and repair the Ezida temple of Nabû storehouses.
 
He is the main subject of a chronicle, "The Crimes and Sacrileges of Nabu-šuma-iškun", uncovered in Uruk in a Seleucid era dwelling belonging to the exorcist Anu-ikṣur on the Parthian mound southeast of the Eanna complex, whose underlying theme is his violation of all moral and legal principles and consequentially – his ignominious demise. His crimes included “burn(ing) alive sixteen Cutheans at Zababa's gate in the heart of Babylon;” “he committed insult and unspeakable slander” of a certain Iltagal-il of the town Dur-ša-Karbi, and “a leek, a thing forbidden in the Ezida, he brought to the temple of Nabû and gave to eat to the one 'entering the temple'(i.e. the priest)," apparently an unforgivable act. Unfortunately the Chronicle was damaged in antiquity so how he met his come-uppance is not preserved. The length of his reign is uncertain, as it is not preserved in chronicle or king list references, but his reign is known to have ended in 748 BC as the chronology is fixed from the reign of Nabû-Nasir onward, and there is a legal text recording the sale of a plot of land, and a grain receipt dated to his tenth year, and two economic texts to his thirteenth year.

Inscriptions

References

 

8th-century BC Babylonian kings
Chaldean kings
8th-century BC rulers